St Mawgan or St Mawgan in Pydar is a village and civil parish in Cornwall, England, United Kingdom. The population of this parish at the 2011 census was 1,307.  The village is situated four miles northeast of Newquay, and the parish also includes the hamlet of Mawgan Porth. The surviving manor house known as Lanherne House is an early 16th-century grade I listed building.  The nearby Royal Air Force station, RAF St Mawgan, takes its name from the village and is next to Newquay Cornwall Airport. The River Menalhyl runs through St Mawgan village and the valley is known as The Vale of Lanherne. It was the subject of a poem by poet Henry Sewell Stokes.

History
There is evidence of Bronze Age and Iron Age settlements, though the village history proper is considered to start from the arrival of the Welsh missionary St Mawgan (or Meugan) and his followers in the 6th century when they set up a monastery and the first church.  The church was replaced by a Saxon church in the 11th century, which was in its turn replaced in the 11 and 12th centuries by the current parish church.

The Arundell family "of Lanherne" have been the chief landowners in St Mawgan  since the 13th century. It was a branch of the prominent and widespread Arundell family also seated at Trerice, Tolverne, Menadarva in Cornwall and at Wardour Castle in Wiltshire. In 1794 Lanherne House, mainly built in the 16th and 17th centuries, became a convent for émigré nuns from Belgium. Many memorials of the Arundells survive in the parish churches of St Mawgan, dedicated to St Mauganus and St Nicholas, including monumental brasses to  George Arundell (1573), Mary Arundell (1578), Cyssel and Jane Arundell (ca. 1580), Edward Arundell (c.1586). Further memorials of the Arundells survive in the nearby St Columba's Church, St Columb Major.

Parish church
St Mawgan has a 13th-century parish church, dedicated to St Mauganus and St Nicholas. The church was originally a cruciform building of the 13th century but was enlarged by a south aisle and the upper part of the tower in the 15th. The unusual rood screen and bench ends are noteworthy and there are many monumental brasses to members of the Arundell family; these include George Arundell, 1573, Mary Arundell, 1578, Cyssel and Jane Arundell, c. 1580, Edward Arundell (?), 1586, The Arundell brasses are mostly in a fragmentary state; parts of some of those originally in the church have been removed to Wardour Castle. (St Mauganus was a Welshman and is also honoured at Mawgan-in-Meneage, and in Wales and Brittany.)

Historic estates

Lanherne
Lanherne House was the manor house for the Arundell family "of Lanherne", lords of the manor of St Mawgan, chief landowners in the parish since the 13th century, many of whose monuments survive in the parish church. They were a branch of the prominent and widespread Arundell family also seated at Trerice, Tolverne, Menadarva in Cornwall and at Wardour Castle in Wiltshire. Lanherne House has been the Lanherne Convent since 1794.

Nanskeval

Nanskeval House was on the parish boundaries of St Mawgan in Pydar (it was demolished in the mid-1970s) and St Columb Major: in 1277 it was spelt Nanscuvel. Nanskeval House was once the home of Liberal MP Edward Brydges Willyams and is still part of the Carnanton estate which is still owned by descendants of the same family. Nans means 'valley' in Old Cornish, and Kivell was thought to derive from the Cornish equivalent of the Welsh word ceffyl, meaning a horse. but as the Cornish for horse is Margh this is an erroneous interpretation. Much more likely is "The valley of the Woodcock" as the Cornish for woodcock is 'Kevelek'. The surname Nankivell and its variants are thought to derive from this place.

Amenities
There are in the village two pubs, The Falcon Inn and The Airways: also at St Mawgan is a bonsai tree nursery and a Japanese Garden attraction, plus a small craft shop. There are two local cricket teams which play Sunday friendlies, the Vale of Lanherne C.C. and St Mawgan C.C.

Antiquities
Arthur Langdon (1896) recorded two Cornish crosses in the parish: one, a small cross, is at Mawgan Cross and the other at Lanherne. The Lanherne cross is a highly ornamented example and stands in the grounds of the nunnery having been brought from Roseworthy in the parish of Gwinear. "It is the most beautiful specimen of an elaborately decorated cross in Cornwall." Andrew Langdon (1994) records four crosses. These are the Lanherne cross, the churchyard cross, Bodrean Cross and Mawgan Cross. The churchyard cross is the best preserved medieval lantern cross in Cornwall. Bodrean Cross (a cross head and small part of the shaft) was found in 1904 at Bodrean Farm in the parish of St Clement. In 1906 the cross head was provided with a new shaft and set up in St Mawgan churchyard.

Education and recreation
The parish has one small primary school: St Mawgan-in-Pydar Primary School. Secondary education is provided by schools in Newquay.

Notable residents

Arundells of Lanherne
 Sir John Arundell of Lanherne alias John FitzAlan, 1st Baron Arundel (died 1379), naval commander and Lord Marshal of England
 John Arundell (1366 - 1435)
 John Arundell (of Lanherne, died 1423), MP for Cornwall (UK Parliament constituency),1404,1406,1411,1414,1416,1417,1422 and 1423
John Arundell (1474–1545) of Lanherne, Receiver General of the Duchy of Cornwall
 Sir John Arundell (of Lanherne, died 1557), MP for Cornwall, 1554
 John Arundell (of Lanherne, died 1590), MP for Helston, Shaftesbury, Preston and Cornwall

Other
Gerry Cawley, wrestling champion

In Art and Literature
In Fisher's Drawing Room Scrap Book, 1835, a poetical illustration  is based on an engraving of a painting by Thomas Allom.

References

External links

 GENUKI website; Mawgan in Pydar
 Cornwall Record Office Online Catalogue for Mawgan in Pydar

Villages in Cornwall
Civil parishes in Cornwall